NGC 1425, also known as IC 1988, is a spiral galaxy in the constellation Fornax. It was discovered by William Herschel on Oct 9, 1790.

See also
 List of NGC objects (1001–2000)

References

External links

Unbarred spiral galaxies
1425
1988
Fornax (constellation)
013602